Rowdy Ranganna is a 1968 Indian Kannada-language film, directed and produced by R. Ramamurthy. The film stars Rajkumar, Jayanthi, Raja Shankar, Balakrishna and Dinesh, with music by Chellapilla Satyam. It is a remake of the Tamil film Thai Pirandhal Vazhi Pirakkum (1958).

Cast

Rajkumar
Raja Shankar
Balakrishna
Dinesh (Kannada actor)
Eshwarappa
Rathnakar
Bhagavan
Ganapathi Bhat
H. R. Shastry
Shyam
Hanumantha Rao
Guggu
Iyengar
Chakravarthy
Jayanthi
Chandrakala
Ramadevi
Indira
Lalitha
M. N. Lakshmi Devi
Narasimharaju in Guest Appearance
Pandari Bai in Guest Appearance
Radhabai in Guest Appearance

Soundtrack
The music was composed by Vijaya Bhaskar.

References

External links
 
 

1968 films
1960s Kannada-language films
Kannada remakes of Tamil films
Films directed by R. Ramamurthy